Charles Jasper Bell (January 16, 1885 – January 21, 1978) was a U.S. Representative from Missouri.

Born in Lake City, Colorado, Bell attended the country schools in Jackson County, Missouri, Lees Summit (Missouri) High School, and the University of Missouri. He graduated from the Kansas City School of Law in 1913 and was admitted to the bar the same year, commencing to practice in Kansas City, Missouri. He served as a member of the city council of Kansas City from 1926 to 1930 and as a member of the committee to draft the administrative code, which the current general law of Kansas City, Missouri is based on. Additionally, he served as judge of the circuit court of Jackson County, Missouri from 1931 until his resignation in 1934.

Bell was elected as a Democrat to the Seventy-fourth through Eightieth Congresses, serving from January 3, 1935 to January 3, 1949). He served as chairman of the Committee on Elections No. 1 during the Seventy-sixth and Seventy-seventh Congresses, and of the Committee on Insular Affairs in the Seventy-eighth and Seventy-ninth Congresses. Bell also served as a member of the Filipino Rehabilitation Commission in 1945 and 1946. He did not run for reelection in 1948 to the Eighty-first Congress, and resumed the practice of law, specifically managing private investments.

He died in Kansas City, Missouri, on January 21, 1978. He was interred in Blue Springs Cemetery, Blue Springs, Missouri.

References

1885 births
1978 deaths
University of Missouri alumni
American Disciples of Christ
Democratic Party members of the United States House of Representatives from Missouri
20th-century American politicians
People from Hinsdale County, Colorado